Tusk (French title: Poo Lorn L'Elephant) is a 1980 French drama film directed by Alejandro Jodorowsky and written by Nicholas Niciphor. The screenplay concerns a young English girl and an Indian elephant who share a common destiny. It is based on the 1935 novel Poo Lorn of the Elephants by Reginald Campbell.

Cast 
Cyrielle Clair as Elise
Anton Diffring as John Morrison
Serge Merlin as Greyson
Christopher Mitchum as Richard Cairn
Michel Peyrelon as Shakley

References

External links 
 
 

 Bracken, Mike. "The Horror Geek Speaks: Alejandro Jodorowsky", IGN.com, May 19, 2003
 Puchalski, Steve. Review of Tusk, hotwired.com, 1992
 Tusk at moviemeter.nl (Dutch)
 Church, David. Alejandro Jodorowsky at sensesofcinema.com
 Tusk at subcin.com
 Tusk at BFI.org
 Book Poo Lorn of the Elephants at The Internet Archive
 Tusk at shockcinemamagazine.com, 1992
 filmexposed.com (United Kingdom), "A Chat With Alejandro Jodorowsky…"
 imperium.lenin.ru (Russian)

1980 films
1980 drama films
Films about elephants
Films directed by Alejandro Jodorowsky
1980s French-language films
Films based on British novels
French drama films
1980s English-language films
1980s French films